The Miss Vermont Teen USA competition is the pageant that selects the representative for the state of Vermont in the Miss Teen USA pageant. It is formerly directed by Sanders & Associates, Inc., dba- Pageant Associates based in Buckhannon, West Virginia from 2004 to 2017 before GDB Theatre and Pageant Productions becoming the new directors of the stage pageant since 2018.

Charlotte Lopez, Miss Vermont Teen USA 1993, was the first Vermont Teen to win the Miss Teen USA crown and the 10th state that won the title for the first time. Four Miss Vermont Teen USA titleholders have won the Miss Vermont USA title and competed at Miss USA.

Prior to 2022, no sisters had been held the Miss and Teen titles in a single state. Vermont became the first state to have biological sisters holding the statewide Miss USA and Miss Teen USA titles simultaneously, when Kenzie Golonka crowned Teen and her sister (and former Teen titleholder) Kelsey crowned Miss.

Kenzie Golonka of Montpelier was crowned Miss Vermont Teen USA 2022 on March 27, 2022 at Spruce Peak Performing Arts Center in Stowe. She represented Vermont for the title of Miss Teen USA 2022.

Results summary

Placements
Miss Teen USAs: Charlotte Lopez (1993)
2nd runners-up: Kara Quinn (1989)
Top 15: Alexandra Marek (2015), Tammy Vujanovic (2016), Kelsey Golonka (2017)
Vermont holds a record of 5 placements at Miss Teen USA.

Awards 
Miss Congeniality: Lavinia Magruder (1996), Karsen Woods (2012)

Winners 

1 Age at the time of the Miss Teen USA pageant

External links
Official website

References

Vermont
Women in Vermont